Laryea Kingston (born 7 November 1980) is a Ghanaian former professional footballer. He played either as an attacking midfielder or as a right winger.

Club career

Early career
Born in Accra, Kingston started his career with local side Great Olympics, whom he joined aged 16, before moving to Libyan side Al-Ittihad Tripoli in 2000, on a loan deal. However, after only four months of this arrangement he returned to Accra, unhappy at his treatment in Tripoli, joining one of Ghana's traditional "Big Two", Hearts of Oak, in 2001. Two years later he moved to Israel, initially with Maccabi Ahi Nazareth. After two Toto Cup matches, Maccabi decided not to retain him and he was signed by Hapoel Tel Aviv, where he played until 2004.

Move to Russia
Russia was Kingston's next destination, where he joined Krylia Sovetov Samara, helping them to third place in the Russian Premier League in his first season. Krylia Sovetov also reached the Cup final that year but were surprisingly defeated 1–0 by Terek Grozny in Moscow. Kingston joined Terek halfway through the 2005 season but was unable to help them avoid a bottom-placed finish and relegation from the top flight into the First Division.

Several of Terek's higher-profile players left as a result of this demotion, and Kingston joined Lokomotiv Moscow on loan for the 2006 season. He was banned for 6 matches in July 2006 for deliberately injuring Dynamo Moscow defender Leandro Fernández.

Hearts
When Terek failed to secure a return to the Premier League, Kingston appeared set for a permanent departure from the Chechen side. Despite an approach from Bolton Wanderers and rumoured interest from Newcastle United and Fulham. Kingston joined Hearts on 25 January 2007 on an initial six-month loan deal. Hearts also negotiated the option to sign him permanently for a further three years at the initial contract's end and exercised this option on 6 June 2007, for a reported fee of £500,000. Kingston's time at Heart of Midlothian is generally considered a disappointment as he was so rarely available to play because of injury and international commitments.

Vitesse
After his release from Hearts, Kingston moved to the Netherlands to sign for Vitesse Arnhem, but was released in December 2010 after just six months with the club.

Move to Israel
Kingston, who had trained with his former club Hearts of Oak after his release from Vitesse, signed a two-year deal with Israeli Premier League side Hapoel Be'er Sheva on 13 July 2011.

On 6 August, kingston scored his first goal for Be'er Sheva in a Free Kick Against Beitar Jerusalem In the Toto Cup in a game which Be'er Sheva won 3–0.

Return to Hearts of Oak
In the January 2012, Kingston returned to Ghana Premier League for his former club Hearts of Oak, signing one and a half-year contract.

Move To America
In March 2013 Kingston signed to USL PRO team Phoenix FC.

After leaving Phoenix, Kingston went on trial with Brunei DPMM of the S.League in November 2013.

International career
Well known as an uncompromising and hard-working player by fellow professionals, Kingston's determined style has occasionally caused him problems, most notably when representing the Ghanaian national side at the 2006 Africa Cup of Nations, when he was sent off during Ghana's 1–0 victory over Senegal following an altercation with Habib Beye. Both players subsequently received unprecedented four-match suspensions, which resultantly ruled Kingston out of contention for the Ghana squad for 2006 World Cup. Kingston returned to prominence for the Black Stars in February 2007 though, scoring in their 4–1 victory over Nigeria in London. He was also excluded from the squad for the 2010 World Cup.

Personal life
Kingston's elder brother, Richard Kingson, is also a professional footballer, who played in goal in all four of Ghana's matches at the 2006 World Cup. Richard was also first-choice at the 2010 tournament. He previously played for Blackpool, Wigan Athletic and Birmingham City.

On 21 November 1997 his son, Jacob, was born, he is currently a professional footballer who plies his trade with Ghanaian club Accra Great Olympics.

References

External links
 
 Appearances at londonhearts.com
 
 Kingston begs Gordon to stay at Hearts stv interview, 26 June 2007.

1980 births
Living people
Footballers from Accra
Ghanaian footballers
Ghana under-20 international footballers
Ghana international footballers
2006 Africa Cup of Nations players
2008 Africa Cup of Nations players
Ghanaian expatriate footballers
Association football midfielders
Scottish Premier League players
Russian Premier League players
Hapoel Tel Aviv F.C. players
Maccabi Ahi Nazareth F.C. players
Expatriate footballers in Israel
Expatriate footballers in Libya
Expatriate footballers in Scotland
Expatriate footballers in Russia
Expatriate footballers in Saudi Arabia
Ghanaian expatriate sportspeople in Libya
Ghanaian expatriate sportspeople in Saudi Arabia
PFC Krylia Sovetov Samara players
Ghanaian expatriate sportspeople in Israel
FC Lokomotiv Moscow players
FC Akhmat Grozny players
Heart of Midlothian F.C. players
Accra Great Olympics F.C. players
Ghanaian expatriate sportspeople in Scotland
SBV Vitesse players
Expatriate footballers in the Netherlands
Eredivisie players
Al-Ittihad Club (Tripoli) players
Ettifaq FC players
Hapoel Be'er Sheva F.C. players
Israeli Premier League players
Saudi Professional League players
Libyan Premier League players